Catechol-O-methyltransferase (COMT) is one of several enzymes that degrade catecholamines (neurotransmitters such as dopamine, epinephrine, and norepinephrine), catecholestrogens, and various drugs and substances having a catechol structure. In humans, catechol-O-methyltransferase protein is encoded by the COMT gene. Two isoforms of COMT are produced: the soluble short form (S-COMT) and the membrane bound long form (MB-COMT). As the regulation of catecholamines is impaired in a number of medical conditions, several pharmaceutical drugs target COMT to alter its activity and therefore the availability of catecholamines. COMT was first discovered by the biochemist Julius Axelrod in 1957.

Function 
Catechol-O-methyltransferase is involved in the inactivation of the catecholamine neurotransmitters (dopamine, epinephrine, and norepinephrine). The enzyme introduces a methyl group to the catecholamine, which is donated by S-adenosyl methionine (SAM). Any compound having a catechol structure, like catecholestrogens and catechol-containing flavonoids, are substrates of COMT.

Levodopa, a precursor of catecholamines, is an important substrate of COMT. COMT inhibitors, like entacapone, save levodopa from COMT and prolong the action of levodopa. Entacapone is a widely used adjunct drug of levodopa therapy. When given with an inhibitor of dopa decarboxylase (carbidopa or benserazide), levodopa is optimally saved. This "triple therapy" is becoming a standard in the treatment of Parkinson's disease.

Specific reactions catalyzed by COMT include:
 Dopamine → 3-methoxytyramine
 DOPAC → HVA (homovanillic acid)
 Norepinephrine → normetanephrine
 Epinephrine → metanephrine
 Dihydroxyphenylethylene glycol (DOPEG) → methoxyhydroxyphenylglycol (MOPEG)
 3,4-Dihydroxymandelic acid (DOMA) → vanillylmandelic acid (VMA)

In the brain, COMT-dependent dopamine degradation is of particular importance in brain regions with low expression of the presynaptic dopamine transporter (DAT), such as the prefrontal cortex. (In the PFC, dopamine is also removed by presynaptic norepinephrine transporters (NET) and degraded by monoamine oxidase.) Controversy exists about the predominance and orientation of membrane bound COMT in the CNS, that is, whether this COMT process is active intracellularly in postsynaptic neurons and glia, or oriented outward on the membrane, acting extracellularly on synaptic and extrasynaptic dopamine.

Soluble COMT can also be found extracellularly, although extracellular COMT plays a less significant role in the CNS than it does peripherally. Despite its importance in neurons, COMT is actually primarily expressed in the liver.

Genetics in humans

The COMT protein is coded by the gene COMT. The gene is associated with allelic variants. The best-studied is Val158Met.
Others are rs737865 and rs165599 that have been studied, e.g., for association with personality traits, response to antidepressant medications, and psychosis risk associated with Alzheimer's disease. COMT has been studied as a potential gene in the pathogenesis of schizophrenia; however meta-analyses find no association between the risk of schizophrenia and a number of polymorphisms, including Val158Met.

Val158Met polymorphism

A functional single-nucleotide polymorphism (a common normal variant) of the gene for catechol-O-methyltransferase results in a valine to methionine mutation at position 158 (Val158Met) rs4680. In vitro, the homozygous Val variant metabolizes dopamine at up to four times the rate of its methionine counterpart. However, in vivo the Met variant is overexpressed in the brain, resulting in a 40% decrease (rather than 75% decrease) in functional enzyme activity. The lower rates of catabolism for the Met allele results in higher synaptic dopamine levels following neurotransmitter release, ultimately increasing dopaminergic stimulation of the postsynaptic neuron. Given the preferential role of COMT in prefrontal dopamine degradation, the Val158Met polymorphism is thought to exert its effects on cognition by modulating dopamine signaling in the frontal lobes.

The gene variant has been shown to affect cognitive tasks broadly related to executive function, such as set shifting, response inhibition, abstract thought, and the acquisition of rules or task structure.

Comparable effects on similar cognitive tasks, the frontal lobes, and the neurotransmitter dopamine have also all been linked to schizophrenia. It has been proposed that an inherited variant of COMT is one of the genetic factors that may predispose someone to developing schizophrenia later in life.  A more recent study cast doubt on the proposed connection between this gene and any alleged casual effect of cannabis on schizophrenia development.

A non-synonymous single-nucleotide polymorphism rs4680 was found to be associated with depressed factor of Positive and Negative Syndrome Scale(PANSS) and  efficiency of emotion in schizophrenia subjects. It is increasingly recognised that allelic variation at the COMT gene are also relevant for emotional processing, as they seem to influence the interaction between prefrontal and limbic regions. Research conducted at the Section of Neurobiology of Psychosis, Institute of Psychiatry, King's College London has demonstrated an effect of COMT both in patients with bipolar disorder and in their relatives, but these findings have not been replicated so far.

The COMT Val158Met polymorphism also has a pleiotropic effect on emotional processing.
Furthermore, the polymorphism has been shown to affect ratings of subjective well-being. When 621 women were measured with experience sample monitoring, which is similar to mood assessment as response to beeping watch, the met/met form confers double the subjective mental sensation of well-being from a wide variety of daily events. The ability to experience reward increased with the number of Met alleles.  Also, the effect of different genotype was greater for events that were felt as more pleasant. The effect size of genotypic moderation was quite large: Subjects with the Val/Val genotype generated almost similar amounts of subjective well-being from a 'very pleasant event' as Met/Met subjects did from a 'bit pleasant event'. Genetic variation with functional impact on cortical dopamine tone has a strong influence on reward experience in the flow of daily life. In one study participants with the met/met phenotype described an increase of positive affect twice as high in amplitude as participants with the Val/Val phenotype following very pleasant or pleasant events.

One review found that those with Val/Val tended to be more extroverted, more novelty-seeking, and less neurotic than those with the Met/Met allele

Temporomandibular joint dysfunction
Temporomandibular joint dysfunction (TMD) does not appear to be a classic genetic disorder, however variations in the gene that codes for COMT have been suggested to be responsible for inheritance of a predisposition to develop TMD during life.

Nomenclature
COMT is the name given to the gene that codes for this enzyme. The O in the name stands for oxygen, not for ortho.

COMT inhibitors
COMT inhibitors include entacapone, tolcapone, opicapone, and nitecapone. All except nitecapone are used in the treatment of Parkinson's disease. Risk of liver toxicity and related digestive disorders restricts the use of tolcapone.

See also 
 Dopamine
 Schizophrenia
 O-methyltransferase

Additional images

References

Further reading

External links 

 
 

EC 2.1.1
O-methylated natural phenols metabolism
O-methylation